Aciphylla aurea is a species of Aciphylla, commonly known as golden speargrass or golden Spaniard. A. aurea is found throughout the South Island of New Zealand, usually in mountainous areas but also lower altitude dry well drained grassland sites.

The aurea part of the name refers to the distinctive golden colour of the plant.

Golden Spaniard flowers from January to February with a yellow or cream colour. The flowerhead is very spiky, quite large and solid.

Taxonomy

Common name/s: golden Spaniard, golden speargrass.

Full scientific name: Aciphylla aurea W.R.B.Oliv.

Description

Aciphylla aurea is easy to identify through many features. One of the features that makes it easy to identify is its very robust tufted flower head, which grows up to 1.5m when in flower (November–December) and which can remain for up to two years. The flowers of this plant are uniquely yellow, and star shaped, in configuration. The plants have a yellowish-green-golden colour on its leaves that are clumped together. The plant fruits between the months of January–February. The leaves are pinnate and grow up to 70 cms long with thin margins.  The difference between a male pant and female plant is that the flower clumps are distributed differently.

Distribution and habitat
Natural global range – Aciphylla aurea is indigenous to New Zealand alpine regions so it is not found anywhere else in the world. But it has some similarities to plants of the same Genus in different countries.

New Zealand range – Aciphylla aurea is found mainly throughout the east coast of South Island (Marlborough- Nelson to Northern Southland) in low to medium alpine regions at roughly 300–1,500 m above sea level.  The other Aciphylla species live throughout New Zealand, in different environments, due to their size and adaptions, to their specific environments  

Habitat preferences – Aciphylla aurea is found in mountainous habitats, in well-drained soils including habitats like rocky outcrops, and tussock grasslands. Aciphylla aurea also has a high tolerance for extreme weather conditions, tolerating fires and temperatures of -17 degrees. Because of this extreme tolerance it now dominates much of the alpine grasslands and tussock grasslands.

Life cycle/phenology
Aciphylla aurea flowers in New Zealand in the early summer months (November December), but this plant flowers prolifically only every few years, not every year and fruits in the late summer months (January - February). This means that it is pollinated by animals. The seeds of this species Aciphylla use anemochory (wind dispersal), this is because the seed of the plant has a high surface area to volume ratio, as found in many alpine species due to the exposure to the elements. This wind dispersal method of winged projections is not that common among plant species, but it enhances the dispersal by wind, and allows the host plant to spread its seeds further, due to this many of the seeds have a paper like texture. The seeds of this plant are usually dark brown in colour and roughly 5.0mm- 7.0mm long. There are some slight differences that sometimes occur between populations of this species in Marlborough/Nelson region and the rest of the population, this variation includes the colour of the seeds being more golden (brown) than dark brown. It is not known how long the seeds remain viable in the soil, although there has been a lot of study on this species not much is known about its germination.

Ecology
Habitat – Golden speargrass prefers well-drained alpine soils, which are windswept and prone to extreme temperatures, such as dry grasslands, and tussock grasslands. This species of Aciphylla prefers drier climates compared to some of its relatives, this might be due to their size and overall tolerance.

Predators, parasites, and diseases - It was believed that before human introduced predators such as sheep and any browsers (bovines) that the main predator of this species was Moa. The browsers that prey on them eat their long colourful leaves rather than the flower stalks because of the height of the leaves compared to the flowers. Although since the sheep have been introduced the Golden Spaniard has become more sheep tolerant, and therefore is one of the reasons why, it now dominates the high country tussock and grasslands.

References

External links
 Taxon page for this species from The Museum of New Zealand Te Papa Tongarewa giving a map of plant distribution and images of specimens

Apioideae
Flora of New Zealand
Plants described in 1956
Taxa named by Walter Oliver